Rogue Male, by Geoffrey Household, is a classic thriller novel, published in 1939. The book was reissued in 2007 with an introduction by Victoria Nelson.

Plot
The protagonist, an unnamed British sportsman and crack shot, sets out in the spring of 1938 to see if he can get an unnamed European dictator in the sights of his rifle. Supposedly interested only in the thrill of hunting a powerful man, he convinces himself that he does not intend to pull the trigger. Caught while taking aim by officers of the dictator's secret police, he is tortured, thrown over a cliff, and left for dead.

The man survives, and with civilian help manages to make his way to a port, where he stows away on a British ship bound for London. Once there, he discovers that agents of the dictator have also arrived in London with orders to kill him. He is forced to kill one by pushing him onto the live rail in the London Underground, after which the police launch a manhunt for him.

Unable to go to the British authorities, who cannot condone assassination of a head of state, the protagonist decides to hide out in Dorset. Reports that he has been sighted reach a man named Quive-Smith, the leader of his pursuers. Seizing the opportunity, Quive-Smith finds his quarry's underground hiding place and blocks the exit, leaving only a single hole for breathing. With the protagonist thus at his mercy, Quive-Smith intends to coerce a written confession, implicating the British government.

The protagonist reflects on his predicament and confesses to himself that he would in fact have pulled the trigger, as revenge for the execution of his fiancée by the dictator's totalitarian régime. Constructing a makeshift ballista, he tricks Quive-Smith into looking down the breathing hole and shoots him dead. Digging his way out, he takes Quive-Smith's identification papers, money, and car. He drives to Liverpool and boards a ship for Tangier. From there, he intends to find the dictator and finish what he started.

Development
Interviewed by the Radio Times for the first screening of the BBC film version of the novel, Household acknowledged that he always intended the protagonist's target to be Hitler, "Although the idea for Rogue Male germinated from my intense dislike of Hitler, I did not actually name him in the book as things were a bit tricky at the time and I thought I would leave it open so that the target could be either Hitler or Stalin. You could take your pick".

Sequel
Household published a sequel, Rogue Justice, in 1982. In the sequel, the protagonist, going undercover in Nazi Germany, looks for a second chance to hunt the European dictator. Allied with escaping Jews and resistance groups, he fights his way across occupied Europe, with the Gestapo hot on his heels.

Adaptations

Film
 Man Hunt, directed by Fritz Lang and starring Walter Pidgeon and George Sanders, was a 1941 Hollywood film based on Rogue Male, in which the unspecified dictator of the novel is explicitly identified as Hitler. For this version, Pidgeon's character is named Captain Alan Thorndike.
 In 2016, Fox Searchlight Pictures was setting up a new adaptation penned by Michael Lesslie (Macbeth, Assassin's Creed) and starring Benedict Cumberbatch. SunnyMarch, Cumberbatch's production company, was also producing.

Television
 Rogue Male was a 1976 BBC TV film, starring Peter O'Toole, John Standing and Alastair Sim. For this version, O'Toole's character was named Sir Robert Hunter.

Radio
 In 1951, the story was adapted for American radio as a half-hour episode of the CBS anthology series Suspense. Herbert Marshall and Ben Wright starred.
 The book was adapted for radio by the BBC, in 1989, as a 90-minute drama starring Simon Cadell and David Googe.
 In 2004, an unabridged reading of Rogue Male, performed by Michael Jayston, in fifteen half-hour episodes, was broadcast on BBC Radio 7. It was broadcast again on Radio 4 Extra in August/September 2012, again in March/April 2014, again in November 2017 and most recently in March 2021. A five-part abridged reading of the sequel, "Rogue Justice", was also performed by Michael Jayston. It was broadcast on BBC Radio 7 in 2009 and subsequently repeated there and on BBC Radio 4 Extra.

Legacy
The book influenced David Morrell's first novel, the 1972 "hunted man" action thriller First Blood, which spawned the Rambo film series. Morrell has acknowledged the debt in several interviews, including: "When I started First Blood, back in 1968, I was deeply influenced by Geoffrey Household's Rogue Male."

In 2005 Robert Macfarlane and Roger Deakin set out to find the possible location of the 'holloway' where the protagonist makes his stand in Dorset. Deakin writes of it in his posthumously published diaries Notes from Walnut Farm, and Macfarlane in his introduction to a reissue of Rogue Male and his own book Holloway.

See also

Operation Foxley, a real-life, never-attempted SOE plan to assassinate Hitler
List of assassinations in fiction

References

1939 British novels
British thriller novels
Novels about Nazi Germany
Chatto & Windus books
British novels adapted into films